Work on What Has Been Spoiled is the second studio album by Borbetomagus, released in 1981 by Agaric Records. It features musical input from power electronics composer and pioneer Hugh Davies.

Track listing

Personnel 
Adapted from Work on What Has Been Spoiled liner notes.

Borbetomagus
 Hugh Davies – electronics
 Don Dietrich – saxophone
 Donald Miller – electric guitar
 Jim Sauter – saxophone, cover art

Production and additional personnel
 Paul Laliberté – cover art
 Mike Smirnoff – photography

Release history

References

External links 
 Work on What Has Been Spoiled at Discogs (list of releases)

1981 albums
Borbetomagus albums